Yannik Paul (born 5 March 1994) is a German professional golfer who plays on the European Tour. He claimed his first victory in his rookie season at the Mallorca Golf Open.

Amateur career
Paul attended the University of Colorado from 2013 to 2018. He was also a member European Amateur Team Championship in 2014, 2015 and 2016, playing alongside his twin brother Jeremy in 2015 and 2016.

Professional career
Paul turned professional in May 2018. He finished runner-up at the Rolex Challenge Tour Grand Final in 2021, securing his playing rights on the 2022 European Tour, ultimately finishing ninth on the Challenge Tour Rankings.

In October 2022, Paul claimed his first victory on the European Tour at the Mallorca Golf Open. He birdied the final hole to win by one shot ahead of Nicolai von Dellingshausen and Paul Waring.

Personal life
Paul's twin brother Jeremy is also a professional golfer who plays on the Korn Ferry Tour, having previously played on the PGA Tour Canada. He also won on the Pro Golf Tour in 2018. He and Jeremy also became the first pair of twins to play in a European Tour event, when they both played in the 2016 BMW International Open.

Professional wins (2)

European Tour wins (1)

Other wins (1)

Results in major championships

CUT = missed the half-way cut

Team appearances
Amateur
European Amateur Team Championship (representing Germany): 2014, 2015, 2016, 2017

See also
2021 Challenge Tour graduates

References

External links

German male golfers
European Tour golfers
Colorado Buffaloes men's golfers
Sportspeople from Frankfurt
1994 births
Living people